Chi Psi Fraternity House may refer to:

Chi Psi Fraternity House (Champaign, Illinois), formerly listed on the National Register of Historic Places in Champaign County, Illinois
Chi Psi Fraternity House (Eugene, Oregon), listed on the National Register of Historic Places in Lane County, Oregon